The Barraba branch railway line is a closed railway line in New South Wales, Australia. The line, which was opened on 21 September 1908,

The railway line crossed the Namoi River at Manilla over a large viaduct and crosses the Peel River just before Attunga. Two Howe timber truss bridges, one over Borah Creek in Upper Manilla (575 km from Sydney Central) and the other over Oakey Creek between Manilla and Attunga (539 km), are heritage listed.

In the 1970s, the Barraba line was served by the unique railmotor, CHP38 (also known as Creamy Kate). At that period, large quantities of asbestos was railed from Barraba in containers for export.

The line is now open for only  for use as grain wagon storage.

A stop block is in place at Dampier Street, Tamworth and the line was damaged by flood along Wallamore Road on 29 November 2008

On 24 November 2017 it was announced that the line from West Tamworth to Westdale silos would be rebuilt for a new freight centre.

References 

Closed regional railway lines in New South Wales
Railway lines opened in 1908
Standard gauge railways in Australia
1908 establishments in Australia
Main North railway line, New South Wales